Radney may refer to:

Radney, Iran, a village in Khuzestan Province, Iran
Radney Foster (born 1959), American singer-songwriter
Radney Bowker (born 1979), English rugby player
Tom Radney (1932-2011), American politician

Masculine given names
Iranian masculine given names